Kildee House is a children's novel by Rutherford George Montgomery. It tells the story of a house in a redwood forest which becomes a refuge for wildlife. The novel was first published in 1949 and was a Newbery Honor recipient in 1950. It is illustrated by Barbara Cooney.

References

1949 American novels
American children's novels
Newbery Honor-winning works
Novels set in California
Books illustrated by Barbara Cooney
Children's novels about animals
Doubleday (publisher) books
1949 children's books